Isostichopus is a genus of sea cucumbers.

List of species 
 Isostichopus badionotus (Selenka, 1867) (warm Atlantic)
 Isostichopus fuscus (Ludwig, 1875) (tropical east Pacific Ocean)
 Isostichopus macroparentheses (Clark, 1922) (Caribbean, rare)

References

External links 

Stichopodidae